Lauren Kate Barnes (born May 31, 1989) is an American professional soccer player who currently plays as a defender for OL Reign of the National Women's Soccer League (NWSL). She previously played for the Philadelphia Independence in the WPS and represented the United States on the under-15, under-20, and under-23 national teams.

Early life
Barnes was born in Arcadia, California to parents, Joyce and Gary Barnes.  She attended Upland High School in Upland, California where she was a four-time first-team All-CIF selection. She was  rated as the number two overall recruit in the nation by RISE Magazine and Soccer Buzz and was named Gatorade Player of the Year for the state of California.  In 2005 and 2006 she was named Parade All-American,  NSCAA/adidas Girls Youth All-American, and 2006 CIF-Southern Section Co-Player of the Year.  In addition to her high school play, Barnes played for local club soccer team, Arsenal FC.

UCLA Bruins, 2007–2010
Barnes attended UCLA where she played for the Bruins from 2007 to 2010.  During her freshman year, she finished the season with one goal and three assists for a total of five points. She was one of six players and just two freshmen to start all 24 matches for the team. She was named to the Soccer America Freshman All-American and Pac-10 All-Freshman Teams. She scored her lone goal for the season in a 3–1 victory over Arizona State and assisted on the game-winning goal in a 3–2 NCAA Quarterfinal victory over University of Portland.

During her sophomore year, Barnes appeared in all 25 matches, starting 24. She ended the season with six points (six assists). Barnes helped the UCLA defense rank first in the country in goals against average (0.23), allowing only six goals in 25 matches. In 2009, Barnes was one of just three players who started all 25 matches and ranked fourth on the team in scoring with 14 points (two goals and ten assists). She tied with Lauren Cheney for the team lead in assists with 10.  Barnes scored the game-winning goal in a 3–2 double-overtime victory over Arizona State.

During her senior year, Barnes played and started 22 of 23 matches. She was a leader of the Bruin defense that surrendered less than a goal a game (0.84). Under her direction, the defense posted nine shutouts in 23 matches. She was also a contributor for the  offense, ranking second on the team in scoring with 16 points (scoring five goals and providing six assists). She scored game-winning goals in wins over San Diego and Washington State and assisted on the game-winning goal in a 2–1 victory over the University of Central Florida in the NCAA Second Round. She was a First-Team All-Pac-10 selection and named Third-Team NSCAA All-American.

Club career

Philadelphia Independence, 2011
Barnes was selected in the third round (fifteenth overall) of the 2011 WPS Draft by the Philadelphia Independence. She was included on the bench for nine matches, but did not make an appearance. The Independence finished second during the regular season with a  record. The team advanced to the playoffs where they defeated magicJack 2–0 in the Super Semifinal. They faced regular season winners Western New York Flash in the WPS Final where they were defeated 5–4 in penalty kicks after a 1–1 draw.

Reign FC, 2013– 

Barnes was selected by the Seattle Reign FC during the 2013 NWSL Supplemental Draft as their second pick (tenth pick overall). Barnes was key component in the Reign's defense playing primarily as a center-back for the squad throughout the 2013 season. During a home match against FC Kansas City on June 9, 2013, her defensive skill was especially highlighted when she reached a shot just before it crossed the goal line that had bounced over goalkeeper Hope Solo's head. With a diving tackle into the netting, Barnes tipped the ball over the crossbar and out of the goal. Along with teammate Christine Nairn, Barnes was one of only two players on the Reign to play in all 22 matches during the 2013 season. She was the only player to start every game tallying 1,949 minutes. After the season ended, Barnes earned team honors for Defender of the Year.

Barnes returned to the Reign for the 2014 season. The team set a league record unbeaten streak of 16 games during the first part of the season. During the 16 game stretch, the Reign compiled a 13–0–3 record. The Reign finished first in the regular season clinching the NWSL Shield for the first time. After defeating the Washington Spirit 2–1 in the playoff semi-finals, the Reign were defeated 2–1 by FC Kansas City during the championship final. Following the regular season, Barnes along with goalkeeper Hope Solo and fellow defender Stephanie Cox were named to the Second XI team. Barnes finished the 2014 season having started in 22 of the 23 games in which she played.

After returning to the Reign for the 2015 season, Barnes started in all 20 games of the regular season playing for all 1,800 minutes in the defender position. During an away match against Sky Blue FC on May 9, she scored an equalizer goal resulting in a 1–1 draw. Barnes served two assists throughout the season. The Reign finished the regular season in first place clinching the NWSL Shield for the second consecutive time. After advancing to the playoffs, Seattle faced fourth-place team Washington Spirit and won 3–0, advancing to the championship final. Seattle was ultimately defeated 1–0 by FC Kansas City during the championship final in Portland. Barnes, along with teammates Kim Little, Beverly Yanez, and Jess Fishlock were named to the NWSL Best XI team.

On May 15, 2021, Barnes became the second player in NWSL history to play in 150 regular season matches and the first to do so playing for a single club, OL Reign.

Loan to Melbourne Victory, 2014 
In January 2014, Barnes joined Seattle Reign FC teammate Jess Fishlock on the Melbourne Victory squad in Australia's W-League as a guest player from the Reign. During her five appearances for the team, she scored two goals and helped the team win the Grand Final where the Victory defeated Brisbane Roar 2–0. Barnes scored the Victory's second goal of the match. The win marked the Victory's first Grand Final title in the history of the team.

Following her successful guest stint, Barnes signed with Melbourne Victory the following season on a loan deal.

Loan to Melbourne City, 2016–present
In October 2016, Barnes signed a loan deal with Melbourne City, alongside Seattle Reign FC teammate Jess Fishlock, with whom she previously played at Melbourne Victory. In October 2017, she commenced pre-season training with Melbourne City, re-signing with them for the 2017–18 W-League season.  Barnes went on to be awarded Melbourne City W-League Player of the Year and was named to the Professional Footballers Australia (PFA) W-League Team of the Year. It was confirmed that Melbourne City re-signed Barnes for the 2018–2019 W-League and 2019/20 seasons.

International career
Barnes has represented the United States at the U-15, U-20, and U-23 levels. In 2010, she helped lead the U-23 team to the 2010 Four Nations Tournament title. In 2016, she received her first senior national team call-up for the 2016 SheBelieves Cup.

FIFA 16 and coaching career
In 2016, Barnes' likeness was added to FIFA 16 as a player for the U.S. national team. In 2012, she was an assistant coach for Division 1 team, UC Riverside. She has served as a trainer for Beast Mode Soccer along with teammate Beverly Yanez.

Honors

Club
 with Philadelphia Independence
 WPS Championship runners-up: 2011

 with Reign FC
 NWSL Shield: 2014, 2015, 2022
 The Women's Cup: 2022
 NWSL Championship runners-up: 2014, 2015

 with Melbourne Victory
 W-League Championship: 2014

 with Melbourne City
 W-League Championship: 2017, 2018, 2020
 W-League Premiership: 2019–20

International
United States
 SheBelieves Cup: 2016

Individual
NWSL Defender of the Year: 2016
NWSL Best XI: 2015, 2016
NWSL Second XI: 2014, 2019
PFA W-League Team of the Year: 2017–18

See also
 List of UCLA people
 United States at the 2007 Pan American Games

References

External links

 
 Philadelphia Independence player profile
 UCLA player profile
 US Soccer player profile

1989 births
Living people
American women's soccer players
Footballers at the 2007 Pan American Games
Melbourne City FC (A-League Women) players
Melbourne Victory FC (A-League Women) players
National Women's Soccer League players
Pan American Games medalists in football
Pan American Games silver medalists for the United States
Parade High School All-Americans (girls' soccer)
People from Upland, California
Philadelphia Independence players
OL Reign players
Soccer players from California
Sportspeople from San Bernardino County, California
UCLA Bruins women's soccer players
United States women's under-20 international soccer players
A-League Women players
Women's association football defenders
Medalists at the 2007 Pan American Games
OL Reign draft picks